This is a list of medalists from the ICF Canoe Sprint World Championships in women's Canoe.

C-1 200 m
Debuted: 2010.

C-1 500 m
Debuted: 2018.

C-1 1000 m
Debuted: 2022.

C-1 5000 m
Debuted: 2018.

C-2 200 m
Debuted: 2018.

C-2 500 m
Debuted: 2011.

C-4 500 m
Debuted: 2021.

Mix C-2 200 m
Debuted: 2021

References
 
 
 

ICF Canoe Sprint World Championships women's Canadian

ICF